Arthur Pierson (June 16, 1901 – January 1, 1975) was a Norwegian-born American actor and director. Born in Oslo, he was brought to the United States and raised in Seattle, Washington. He made his Broadway acting debut in 1929 in Remote Control. He continued to appear on stage throughout the 1930s, appearing in plays such as Night of January 16th (1935) and a Broadway production of Othello (1937). His last Broadway appearance was in The Unconquered in 1940.

In 1932 he took up film acting as well, appearing in Lloyd Corrigan's No One Man. He subsequently appeared in over a dozen movies, usually in minor roles. Among his best-known film roles was Capitano Lorenzo in the Laurel and Hardy comedy The Devil's Brother (1933). In 1947 he went behind the camera to direct Dangerous Years. He directed two other features, The Fighting O'Flynn (1949) and Home Town Story (1951), before turning to television as a director and producer. In his later years he was an executive at animation studio Hanna-Barbera. He died of a heart attack on January 1, 1975, in Santa Monica, California.

Filmography

References

External links

1901 births
1975 deaths
Norwegian emigrants to the United States
20th-century American male actors
American male film actors
American male stage actors
Film directors from Washington (state)
Male actors from Oslo
Male actors from Seattle